Bouhinor is a settlement in the department of Bignona in Ziguinchor Region in Senegal. In 2015 its population was estimated at 277.

References

External links
PEPAM

Populated places in the Bignona Department
Arrondissement of Tenghory